is a former Japanese football player.

Playing career
Fukai was born in Fujikawa, Yamanashi on September 13, 1980. After graduating from Komazawa University, he joined the J1 League club Kashima Antlers in 2003. He played many matches every season. The Antlers won second place in 2003 and in the 2006 J.League Cup. In 2007, he moved to Albirex Niigata. In 2008, he moved to Nagoya Grampus. However he did not play much. In August 2008, he moved to JEF United Chiba. He played many matches as forward with Seiichiro Maki who was a teammate at Komazawa University. However JEF United finished in last place in the 2009 season and was relegated to the J2 League for the first time in the club's history. Although he played often in 2012, he could not play much in 2013 due to an injury.  He resigned at the end of the 2013 season. In July 2014, he joined the J2 club V-Varen Nagasaki and played two seasons. In 2016, he moved to the J3 League club SC Sagamihara and played many matches. He retired at the end of the 2016 season.

Club statistics

1Includes Promotion Playoffs to J1.

References

External links

1980 births
Living people
Komazawa University alumni
Association football people from Yamanashi Prefecture
Japanese footballers
J1 League players
J2 League players
J3 League players
Kashima Antlers players
Albirex Niigata players
Nagoya Grampus players
JEF United Chiba players
V-Varen Nagasaki players
SC Sagamihara players
Association football forwards